Grant Leitch is a former professional footballer who played primarily as a winger. Leitch played 25 Football League games for Blackpool between 1991 and 1994, scoring one goal in the competition, and went on to play for Conference club Halifax Town.

Honours
Blackpool
 Football League Fourth Division play-off winner: 1991-92

References
Blackpool players at Neil Brown's statistical website

Living people
1972 births
English footballers
Blackpool F.C. players
Halifax Town A.F.C. players
English Football League players
Association football wingers